2022 Iranian protests can refer to:

2021–2022 Iranian protests, related to power and water insecurity and broader demands for democracy
2022 Iranian food protests, related to food insecurity
Mahsa Amini protests, begun in September 2022 and related to police brutality by virtue police against women